Lithophane unimoda, the dowdy pinion, is a species of cutworm or dart moth in the family Noctuidae. It is found in North America.

The MONA or Hodges number for Lithophane unimoda is 9916.

References

Further reading

 
 
 

unimoda
Articles created by Qbugbot
Moths described in 1878